Everett Ross Dempster (1903 – January 27, 1992) was an American geneticist and professor at the University of California, Berkeley, where he was chair of the Department of Genetics from 1963 to 1970.

References

1903 births
1992 deaths
University of California, Berkeley alumni
University of California, Berkeley faculty
American geneticists
Scientists from San Francisco